is a railway station in Aoi-ku, Shizuoka, Shizuoka Prefecture, Japan, operated by the private railway company, Shizuoka Railway (Shizutetsu).

Lines
Hiyoshichō Station is a  station on the Shizuoka–Shimizu Line and is 0.5 kilometers from the starting point of the line at Shin-Shizuoka Station.

Station layout
The station has two opposed side platforms with a level crossing at one end. It has automated ticket machines, and automated turnstiles, which accept the LuLuCa smart card ticketing system as well as the PiTaPa and ICOCA IC cards.

Platforms

Adjacent stations

|-
!colspan=5| Shizuoka Railway Company

Station History
It was renamed to its present name after World War II.

Passenger statistics
In fiscal year 2017, Hiyoshichō station was used by an average of 729 passengers daily (boarding passengers only).

Surrounding area
Japan National Route 1

See also
 List of railway stations in Japan

References

External links

 Shizuoka Railway official website

Railway stations in Shizuoka Prefecture
Railway stations in Japan opened in 1908
Railway stations in Shizuoka (city)